Huisseling en Neerloon is a former municipality in the Dutch province of North Brabant. It covered the villages of Huisseling and Neerloon.

Huisseling en Neerloon merged with Ravenstein in 1923.

References

Former municipalities of North Brabant
Oss